The Blue Letter is an American hardcore/metal band, where they primarily play a emo, hardcore punk, metalcore, post-hardcore styles of music, while they claim to be a "down tempo screamo" group. They come from Richmond, Virginia. The band started making music in 2003. The band released, a studio album, When Will These Barricades Fall, in 2004, with Reactivation Media. They released, a split-extended play, Splitsville, with The Gospel Is a Grenade, on Guevara Entertainment, in 2005. Their subsequent release, also an extended play, Prima Facie, was released in 2007, with Blood & Ink Records. The latest release, Love Is Not Control, was released by Init Records, in 2012.

Background
The Blue Letter is a hardcore/metal band from Richmond, Virginia. Their members are guitarist and vocalist, Dan Shebaylo, bassist and vocalist, Brendan Artz, and drummer and vocalist Silas Zdybel. A former member, Chad Seely, a bassist and vocalist, left the band after the Prima Facie release.

Music history
The band commenced as a musical entity in 2003, with their first release, When Will These Barridcades Fall, a studio album, that was released in 2004, from Reactivation Media Company. Their second release, a split-extended play, with The Gospel Is a Grenade, Splitsville, released in 2005, by Guevara Entertainment. The subsequent release, Prima Facie, was an extended play, that was released by Blood and Ink Records, in 2007. Their latest release, a studio album, Love Is Not Control, was released by Init Records, in 2012.

Members
Current members
 Dan Shebaylo - guitar, vocals
 Brendan Artz - bass, vocals
 Silas Zdybel - drums, vocals
Former members
 Chad Seely – bass, vocals (2003-2007)
 Blake Merwin - guitar, vocals (2002-2004)

Discography
Studio albums
 When Will These Barricades Fall (2004, Reactivation)
 Love Is Not Control (2012, Init Records)
EPs
 Prima Facie (2007, Blood and Ink)

References

External links
 Facebook profile
 Blood and Ink Records
 Christ Core interview

Musical groups from Virginia
2003 establishments in Virginia
Musical groups established in 2003
Blood and Ink Records artists